The Pelkus Gate near Utrecht is an oil painting by Jan van Goyen, completed in 1646. It is one of about a dozen paintings by Van Goyen that depicted the Pelkus gate, a freestanding tower on the river Vecht that disappeared by the 18th century. It is currently on display at the Metropolitan Museum of Art.

Context
Van Goyen completed about a dozen paintings depicting some form of the Pelkus gate. Each of the paintings' surroundings and structures vary greatly, suggesting that they were invented by van Goyen.

Reference

1646 paintings
Paintings by Jan van Goyen
Landscape paintings
Paintings in the collection of the Metropolitan Museum of Art
Maritime paintings